James Robert McLean (September 21, 1823 – April 15, 1870) was a prominent Confederate politician. He was born in Halifax County, North Carolina and later represented the state in the First Confederate Congress from 1862 to 1864. He also served in the Confederate Army.

References 

1823 births
1870 deaths
Members of the Confederate House of Representatives from North Carolina
People from Halifax County, North Carolina